Thomas Moule (14 January 1784 – January 1851) was an English antiquarian, writer on heraldry, and one of Victorian England's most influential map-makers.  He is best known for his popular and highly decorated county maps of England, steel-engraved and first published separately between 1830 and 1832.

Moule was born in Marylebone, London.  He sold books in Duke Street, Grosvenor Square, from 1816 to 1822.  Later, he became an inspector of 'blind' (illegibly addressed) letters at the General Post Office.  He died at his residence in St. James's Palace, to which he was entitled as Chamber-keeper in the Lord Chamberlain's Department.

Works 

 with John Preston Neale and John Le Keux

with William Westall
 with William Westall
 with William Westall

References

Sources

External links
The English Counties Delineated: Cornwall, 1838

1784 births
1851 deaths
19th-century English people
English antiquarians
English cartographers
People from Marylebone